The University of Colorado Boulder (CU Boulder, CU, or Colorado) is a public research university in Boulder, Colorado. Founded in 1876, five months before Colorado became a state (after the University of Denver, founded in 1864), it is the flagship university of the University of Colorado system. CU Boulder is a member of the Association of American Universities, a selective group of major research universities in North America, and is classified among R1: Doctoral Universities – Very high research activity. In 2021, the university attracted the support of over $634 million for research and spent $536 million on research and development according to the National Science Foundation, ranking it 50th in the nation.

The university consists of nine colleges and schools and offers over 150 academic programs, enrolling more than 35,000 students as of January 2022.

To date, 5 Nobel Prize laureates, 10 Pulitzer Prize winners, 11 MacArthur "Genius Grant" recipients, 1 Turing Award laureate, and 20 astronauts have been affiliated with CU Boulder as alumni, researchers, or faculty. In 2022, the university received over $658 million in sponsored research to fund programs like the Laboratory for Atmospheric and Space Physics and JILA.

The Colorado Buffaloes compete in 17 varsity sports and are members of the NCAA Division I Pac-12 Conference. The Buffaloes have won 28 national championships: 20 in skiing, seven total in men's and women's cross country, and one in football. The university has produced 10 Olympic medalists. Over 1,000 students participate in over 34 intercollegiate club sports annually.

History

On March 14, 1876, the Colorado territorial legislature passed an amendment to the state constitution that provided money for the establishment of the University of Colorado in Boulder, the Colorado School of Mines in Golden, and the Colorado Agricultural College in Fort Collins.

Two cities competed for the site of the University of Colorado: Boulder and Cañon City. The consolation prize for the losing city was to be the home to the new Colorado State Prison. Cañon City was at a disadvantage as it was already the home of the Colorado Territorial Prison. (There are now six prisons in the Cañon City area.)

The cornerstone of the building that became Old Main was laid on September 20, 1875. The doors of the university opened on September 5, 1877. At the time, there were few high schools in the state that could adequately prepare students for university work, so in addition to the university, a preparatory school was formed on campus. In the fall of 1877, the student body consisted of 15 students in the college proper and 50 students in the preparatory school. There were 38 men and 27 women, and their ages ranged from 12 to 23 years.

During World War II, Colorado was one of 131 colleges and universities nationally that took part in the V-12 Navy College Training Program which offered students a path to a navy commission.

CU hired its first female professor, Mary Rippon, in 1878. It hired its first African-American professor, Charles H. Nilon, in 1956, and its first African-American librarian, Mildred Nilon, in 1962. Its first African American female graduate, Lucile Berkeley Buchanan, received her degree in 1918.

Campus

The main CU Boulder campus is located south of the Pearl Street Mall and east of Chautauqua Auditorium. It consists of academic and residential buildings as well as research facilities. The East Campus is about a quarter-mile from the main campus and is composed mainly of athletic fields and research buildings.
CU Boulder's campus has been ranked as one of the most beautiful college campuses in the United States by Travel + Leisure and Condé Nast Traveler.

Architecture
CU Boulder's distinctive architecture style, known as Tuscan Vernacular Revival, was designed by architect Charles Klauder. The oldest buildings, such as Old Main (1876) and Macky Auditorium (1923), were in the Collegiate Gothic style of many East Coast schools, and Klauder's initial plans for the university's new buildings (approved in 1919) were in the same style. A month or so after approval, however, Klauder updated his design by sketching in a new wrap of rough, textured sandstone walls with sloping, multi-leveled red-tiled roofs and Indiana limestone trim. This formed the basis of a unified style, used in the design of fifteen other buildings between 1921 and 1939 and still followed on the campus to this day.

The sandstone used in the construction of nearly all the buildings on campus was selected from a variety of Front Range mountain quarries. In 2011, Travel+Leisure named the Boulder campus one of the most beautiful college campuses in the United States.

Residence halls
Currently, freshmen and others attending the University of Colorado Boulder have an option of 24 on- and off-campus residence halls. Residence halls have 17 varieties of room types from singles to four-person rooms and others with apartment-style amenities. There are several communities of residence halls located throughout the campus, as well as in a separate area called Williams Village which is located approximately 1.5 miles off of the main campus. There is a free bus service that transports students to the main campus from Williams Village and vice versa. The university also offers Residential Academic Programs (RAPS) in many of its Residence Halls. RAPs provide students with in-dorm classes tailored to academic interests (international affairs, environmental studies, etc.).

Engineering Center
The Engineering Center on the North-East side of campus houses the nation's largest geotechnical centrifuge as well as ion-implantation and microwave-propagation facilities, spectrometers, electron and other microscopes, and a structural analysis facility.

Norlin Library

Until 1903, the library collection was housed with the rest of the school in Old Main. The growing size of the library required a move, as the weight of the books was causing physical damage to the floor. The cornerstone for the first separate library building was laid in January 1903, and the building was opened in January 1904. When the new Norlin Library opened in 1940, the old library was turned over to the Theatre department and was converted into classrooms and a theatre.

Norlin Library was the last building to be designed by Klauder. There are two inscriptions on the western face of the building, overlooking the Norlin Quadrangle. Both were composed by President Norlin. The larger inscription reads "Who knows only his own generation remains always a child," based on a Cicero quotation, while the smaller inscription on the marble just over the door reads "Enter here the timeless fellowship of the human spirit."

Macky Auditorium

Macky Auditorium is a large building on the north edge of the University of Colorado campus, near 17th Street and University Avenue, which plays host to various talks, plays, and musical performances. Andrew J. Macky was a prominent businessman involved with the town of Boulder in the late 19th century. Macky served as the President, as well as a stockholder of the First National Bank, an institution founded by another early CU supporter, Lewis Cheney. Macky is credited with a number of landmarks throughout Boulder, where he was a carpenter and involved in politics.

The Auditorium opened its doors in 1923, thirteen years after construction started. Macky's adopted daughter, May, sued for a third of Macky's estate, a case that took thirteen years to settle. May was angered that her father left her no money in his will while leaving $300,000 to CU for the hall's construction. The university eventually won the case, and the majority of critical construction on the building resumed.

The building has a variety of architectural elements from various buildings around the globe that President Baker, CU's president at the turn of the 20th century, admired. The design of the auditorium is primarily Neo-Gothic, with the primary materials being sandstone and red tile, like the rest of campus. The result is a unique building, with two large towers and sprawling ivy, that sets itself apart from the rest of the CU campus. Macky was refurbished in 1986, with improved seating, custom carpeting, modern plumbing, and an elevator. Currently, there is an electronic bell system in the towers of Macky which rings the hours during the day.

Macky is the home of two departments both in the College of Music, the Jazz Studies Department and the Choral Department, and it houses an art gallery that is open Wednesdays, and to patrons during performances. The hall houses almost all performances by the Boulder Philharmonic Orchestra, the Artist Series, and the CU Opera. Macky is also the home of many lectures including part of the Conference on World Affairs held at CU each spring.

University Memorial Center

In 1947, Colorado Governor Lee Knous issued a proclamation to create a memorial to Colorado's servicemen at the University of Colorado Boulder. A proposal to house this memorial in a student union building resulted in a remarkable fundraising effort. The University Memorial Center (UMC) opened its doors in October 1953 with President Robert Stearns presiding over the ribbon-cutting ceremony. The UMC quickly became the central landmark of the Boulder campus. A 1964 addition created a new book store, conference facilities, additional dining facilities, and offices to house the rapidly growing student activities and organizations. The expansion was financed through bonds granted by student fees.

The 1960s and '70s put the UMC at the center of student activism as students staged strikes, grape boycotts, love-ins, sit-ins, and walk-outs. The UMC Fountain Court (now the Dalton Trumbo Fountain Court) became a familiar sight to network television news watchers as the famous and notorious promoted their cause at CU Boulder. Entertainers as diverse as Ramsey Lewis and the Grateful Dead have performed in the Glenn Miller Ballroom. The UMC Connection, a student entertainment center in the basement, is a more informal gathering place, featuring pool tables and a small bowling alley. It also features Club 156, which hosts concerts from local and up-and-coming bands. In 1986, students passed another bond issue to remodel the food-services area. The Alferd Packer Grill gets its name from Alferd Packer, a famous historical cannibal in Colorado. Many exotic meals can be found here.

Center for Community
The Center for Community, also known as the C4C by students, follows the distinct architecture guidelines of Charles Klauder and is a  facility that is promised to be 20 percent to 25 percent more energy- and water-efficient compared to similar-sized buildings. The facility was completed in September 2010 at a cost of $84.4 million. The building is originally bond-financed through the CU treasurer and will be repaid through a combination of sources. A large portion of the debt, $47.4 million, will be repaid by Housing and Dining Services, through room and board fees. Fees from Permit and Parking Services will contribute as well. The center also relies on $18 million in donations, a goal which has not been achieved, but has become a top fundraising priority for the university.

The building houses offices of Student Services including Campus Card Services, Disability Services, and Career Services among others. These services have been relocated to the C4C from various locations around campus. For example, Career Services was previously housed in the basement of the Willard Dormitory. There is a  underground parking structure that contains approximately 365 to 375 parking spaces. Student study areas are located on the upper floors and conference centers are open to campus and non-campus affiliates throughout the building. The dining services offered within the C4C include a CU on the run "grab-n-go", The Bakery, a late-night dining hub called the Weather Tech Café, open until 2 A.M., and finally a central dining facility. This dining facility seats 900 and offers students up to nine specialty dining choices including Persian, Asian, Latin, sushi, Italian, Kosher, a grill, salad bars, and desserts. Overall the Dining Center is projected to serve around one million meals per year.

Recreation Center
In 1973 the student recreation center was built on the CU Boulder's main campus, by the architect James Wallace. The funding to build the recreation center came entirely from student fees, which also funded the expansions in 1990 and 2014. The recreation center features strength and cardio space, basketball/volleyball courts, the only ice rink in Boulder proper, lap pool, dive well, fitness studios (cycling, rowing, etc.), climbing gym, turf gym, and an iconic outdoor pool in the shape of the CU Boulder buffalo mascot. The center is co-managed by the division of student affairs and CUSG, CU Boulder's student government. It is located on the northern edge of campus next to Folsom Field. It is open seven days a week and on average 16 hours a day with most of its facilities available for use during those hours.

Mary Rippon Theatre

The Mary Rippon Theatre is an outdoor theater and the site of many cultural events, notably the Colorado Shakespeare Festival. The Theatre was named after Professor Mary Rippon, the first female instructor at the university and one of the first female university instructors in the United States. She taught German and French. Professor Rippon was so popular with students that when attempts were made to replace her with a male instructor, the student body revolted en masse, and Rippon kept her job.

Old Main
Old Main is the oldest building on campus, and previously served as the Medical School for the University of Colorado system.

Galleries
Norlin Library features two art galleries, several dedicated art spaces, and artworks on display throughout the building. The CU Art Museum features works of modern and contemporary art, as well as historical artworks. The Museum's permanent collection includes over 5,000 works of art from numerous time periods and cultures. The UMC Art Gallery exhibits a variety of visual offerings ranging from student works created on campus to presentations of internationally recognized artists. Andrew J. Macky Gallery showcases the work of both local and national artists and is housed in the historic Macky Auditorium.

Museums
University of Colorado Museum of Natural History has one of the most extensive natural history collections in the Rocky Mountain and Plains regions, representing the disciplines of anthropology, botany, entomology, paleontology, and zoology. It is located in the Henderson building, named after its first curator, Judge Junius Henderson, and hosts the Museum and Field Studies master's (MS) program. The CU Heritage Center tells the stories of CU Boulder's past and present and is housed in Old Main, the first building constructed on campus. Seven galleries exhibit art and memorabilia associated with CU faculty and alumni. Fiske also offers a hands-on science museum with interactive exhibits and space-themed art.

Performing arts facilities
The University of Colorado Boulder College of Music presents over 400 performances and educational events bringing together faculty, students, and guest artists each year through the Pendulum New Music Series. They present musical genres including classical, jazz, world music, and new music. The University of Colorado Boulder Department of Theatre & Dance is home to the Charlotte York Irey Dance Theatre, the University Theatre, and the Loft Theatre as well as Grusin Music Hall and the Chamber Music Hall in the College of Music. More than twenty productions are presented each year featuring student and faculty actors, dancers, choreographers, directors, and designers, as well as the work of professional guest artists. Student work is also showcased in the annual CU Boulder Fringe Festival, produced by OnStage, a student performing arts group.

Visual Arts Complex

A new visual arts complex that houses the Department of Art and Art History and the CU Art Museum officially opened on September 24, 2010. The new facility houses programming in Art History, Ceramics, Drawing, Foundations, Integrated Art, Painting, Printmaking (screen printing, intaglio, lithography), Sculpture, and Integrated Media Arts Practices (IMAP) including Digital, Photography, and Video Art. The building contains studio classrooms, seminar rooms, a wood-shop with a CNC Machine and metal shop, and a 200-seat auditorium. It also has resources for art and art history majors, including darkrooms, graduate student and faculty studios and offices, as well as twenty-eight student exhibition spaces throughout the facility. Additional resources include the Visual Resources Center, the Exhibitions Program of the CU Art Museum, the Colorado Collection (an art collection of approximately 5,000 pieces), and multiple computing labs.

The Hill 
The Hill, a college neighborhood in Boulder, Colorado, lies directly west of the University of Colorado campus. The central street of the neighborhood is 13th street, which features a variety of attractions including the renowned concert venue, The Fox Theater and is nearby The Sink and several other attractions.

Admissions

Undergraduate 

The 2022 annual ranking of U.S. News & World Report categorizes CU Boulder as "selective". For the Class of 2025 (enrolled fall 2021), CU Boulder received 54,756 applications and accepted 43,576 (79.6%). Of those accepted, 6,785 enrolled, a yield rate (the percentage of accepted students who choose to attend the university) of 15.6%. CU Boulder's freshman retention rate is 87%, with 74% going on to graduate within six years.

Of the 32% of the incoming freshman class who submitted SAT scores; the middle 50 percent Composite scores were 1180-1380. Of the 16% of enrolled freshmen in 2021 who submitted ACT scores; the middle 50 percent Composite score was between 25 and 31. In the 2020–2021 academic year, 8 freshman students were National Merit Scholars.

Academics

The University of Colorado Boulder is divided into several colleges and schools. While the college of Arts and Sciences is by far the largest, the university also consists of the college of Engineering and Applied Sciences, the Program in Environmental Design, Education, Music, Law, and the Leeds School of Business, plus a new College of Media, Communication, and Information that debuted in 2014. Most, if not all, of these colleges and schools, also incorporate master- and doctorate-level degree programs. At the university, there are currently approximately 3,400 courses available in over 150 disciplines making up 85 majors ranging from Accounting to Women's Studies.

University of Colorado School of Law is the smallest and most selective of the colleges. The Wolf Law Building, the new home of the Law School, was dedicated on September 8, 2006, by United States Supreme Court justice Stephen Breyer.

The Leeds School of Business has an enrollment of 3,300 students including undergraduates, master's candidates, and Ph.D. candidates. The undergraduate program ranks 39th in the country and the undergraduate entrepreneurship program ranks 14th in the nation. The MBA program ranks 26th among all public universities. The faculty are ranked 38th in the nation according to the Academy of Management Journal.

CU Boulder adopted an honor code in 2000 following growing concerns about academic dishonesty on campus in the late 1990s. A copy of the code stating "On my honor, as a University of Colorado Boulder student, I have neither given nor received unauthorized assistance on this work" is engraved on a metal plate and posted in every classroom on campus.

Undergraduates who seek an academic challenge may participate in CU's Honors Program. Begun in 1931, the Honors Program currently consists of the top ten percent of incoming freshmen and participating undergraduates with a 3.3 GPA or greater (on a 4.0 scale). The program offers over 40 honors classes each semester taught by tenured or tenure-track professors and limited to class sizes of 17 students. Honors students also have the opportunity to graduate with honors, high honors, and highest honors, by writing and defending a thesis during their senior year. The program extends into the residence halls through the Kittredge Honors Program. The Presidents Leadership Class is a program for top scholars at the University of Colorado Boulder. Scholars participate in a four-year leadership development program. The program provides opportunities to the top fifty students at CU from every major and discipline.

One option for students (mostly freshman and sophomores) living on campus is to join a residential academic program (RAP). Each RAP focuses on a curricular theme and offers courses in the residence hall itself. The programs also include educational activities.

Rankings

U.S. News & World Report ranked the University of Colorado Boulder tied for 99th best among all national universities, tied for 42nd among public universities in the U.S. for 2022, and 50th best among all universities globally for 2020. The Center for World University Rankings ranked CU Boulder 19th among U.S. public comprehensive institutions and 63rd overall in the world in its 2014 ranking of the top 100 degree-granting institutions of higher education.

Fifteen CU Boulder graduate school specialty programs are ranked in the top 50 in the nation by U.S. News & World Report in 2020. CU Boulder's atomic/molecular/optical physics program is ranked second nationally. Other CU Boulder programs ranking in the top 10 are environmental law (8), ceramics (5), quantum physics (6), physical chemistry (10), and aerospace engineering (10). U.S. News & World Report also ranked the Education school 29th, the Engineering school tied for 23rd, the Law school tied for 45th, and the Business school tied for 79th for 2020.

In 2015, Thomson-Reuters ranked the University of Colorado system as the 28th most innovative educational institution in the world.

In 2015, Sierra Magazine ranked CU Boulder 52nd in its "Coolest Schools" in America list for campus sustainability and climate change efforts.

Faculty
, there were more than 3,800 tenured or tenure-eligible faculty members, as well as 4,400 non-tenured adjunct professors and instructors. Current faculty include Nobel laureates David J. Wineland (physics 2012), John Hall (physics, 2005), Eric Cornell (physics, 2001), and Thomas Robert Cech (chemistry, 1989). Carl Wieman was also awarded a Nobel prize for his work with Eric Cornell. He maintains a part-time appointment at the University of Colorado Boulder but his primary appointment is Professor and Director of the Carl Wieman Science Education Initiative at the University of British Columbia. Controversial writer Ward Churchill was a professor of ethnic studies until he was terminated in July 2007. Robert T. Craig an International Communication Association Fellow and author of "Communication Theory as a Field" is a professor in the Communication Department. Professor Emerita Susan Kingsley Kent is the Chair of the Department of Religious Studies.

Center for Advanced Engineering and Technology Education
The Center for Advanced Engineering and Technology Education (CAETE) is a partnership between the College of Engineering and Applied Science and the Division of Continuing Education and Professional Studies at the University of Colorado Boulder. As the distance learning and professional studies arm of the College of Engineering and Applied Science, CAETE provides courses from the college to working professionals via the Internet and CD-ROM. Students can take courses for professional development or toward earning a master's degree or graduate certificate (in some disciplines) in aerospace engineering, computer science, electrical, computer and energy engineering, engineering management, and telecommunications. Founded in 1983, CAETE currently receives over 1,000 enrollments a year from over 250 job sites in Colorado, across the nation, and abroad.

Media
The CU Independent is the award-winning, student-run news publication for the University of Colorado Boulder. It has been digital-only since 2006, one of the first major college newspapers to drop its print edition. The publication has a staff of about 60 editors, reporters, and photographers who are responsible for producing new content to update the website at least once a day during the fall and spring semesters. Most contributors are journalism majors, but other CU programs are represented as well. A managing editor and an editor-in-chief oversee the website. The CU Independent serves as a testing pad for community news and multimedia.

1000-Word Philosophy is a philosophy blog that publishes introductory 1000-word (or less) essays on philosophical topics.
Most of the authors are the students and graduates of the CU Boulder. The blog is created and edited by Andrew D. Chapman, a philosophy lecturer at this university. The essays generally include references or sources for more information.

What’s Wrong? is the "not quite official" blog of the University of Colorado, Boulder's Center for Values and Social Policy. It is edited by David Boonin, professor of philosophy and Associate Dean for Arts and Humanities. The blog's purpose is to provide "a forum for discussing and reporting on topics in applied normative philosophy".

Research institutes
CU Boulder's research mission is supported by 11 research institutes within the university. Each research institute supports faculty from multiple academic departments, allowing institutes to conduct truly multidisciplinary research.

The Institute for Behavioral Genetics (IBG) is a research institute within the Graduate School dedicated to conducting and facilitating research on the genetic and environmental bases of individual differences in behavior. After its founding in 1967 IBG led the resurging interest in genetic influences on behavior. IBG was the first post-World War II research institute dedicated to research in behavioral genetics. IBG remains one of the top research facilities for research in behavioral genetics, including human behavioral genetics, psychiatric genetics, quantitative genetics, statistical genetics, and animal behavioral genetics.

The Institute of Cognitive Science (ICS) at CU Boulder promotes interdisciplinary research and training in cognitive science. ICS is highly interdisciplinary; its research focuses on education, language processing, emotion, and higher-level cognition using experimental methods. It is home to a state-of-the-art fMRI system used to collect neuroimaging data.

ATLAS Institute is a center for interdisciplinary research and academic study, where engineering, computer science and robotics are blended with design-oriented topics. Part of CU Boulder's College of Engineering and Applied Science, the institute offers academic programs at the undergraduate, master's and doctoral levels, and administers research labs, hacker and makerspaces, and a black box experimental performance studio. At the beginning of the 2018–2019 academic year, approximately 1,200 students were enrolled in ATLAS academic programs and the institute sponsored six research labs.

In addition to IBG, ICS and ATLAS, the university's other institutes include Biofrontiers Institute, Cooperative Institute for Research in Environmental Sciences, Institute of Arctic & Alpine Research (INSTAAR), Institute of Behavioral Science (IBS) JILA, Laboratory for Atmospheric & Space Physics (LASP), Renewable & Sustainable Energy Institute (RASEI), and the University of Colorado Museum of Natural History.

Campus organizations

The University of Colorado Student Government

The University of Colorado Student Government (CUSG) is the student government for the University of Colorado Boulder. The government contains three branches: executive, legislative, and judicial. Presiding officers for the student government are elected in a bi-annual vote administered to the 30,000 students at the university. The student government has an autonomy agreement with the University Administration and oversees an annual budget of $36.6 million. CUSG is responsible for the management of the University Student Union, the Recreation Center, the LGBTQ Resource Center, the Women's Resource Center, and the Wardenburg Health Center, along with various other facilities on campus. The government also oversees the fiscal appropriations of over 120 student groups on a yearly basis.

CU Gaming & Esports 
Founded in December 2015, CU Gaming is the University of Colorado's largest student organization with over 3,500 current members. The organization offers biweekly and monthly gaming events for its members as well as the general student population at CU. CU Gaming offers leadership, career, and internship opportunities for members who are interested in working in the gaming and esports industries.

CU Esports, CU Gaming's sister organization, fields over a dozen teams in a variety of games. In November 2020, CU Esports' Valorant Black Team was crowned the Collegiate Valorant Conference Fall 2020 Series Champions after defeating UCF Esports 2–1 in the finals.

Hiking Club 
Founded in May 1919, the Hiking Club is the longest running student organization at the University of Colorado Boulder. It is a non-profit, student-run organization for university students and affiliates interested in hiking and outdoors activities, with hundreds of active members on campus.

The club motto, "half mile more," dates back to the 1940s of the club's tradition-rich history. A slide show of the club's activities is shown on campus during semi-annual new member meetings and the alumni association meets annually.

Radio 1190

KVCU AM-1190, popularly known as Radio 1190, is a college radio station affiliated with the University of Colorado Boulder. Staff of the station are compensated with funds provided by the University of Colorado Student Union while operating funds are raised during biannual on-air pledge drives. It is also run by volunteers from the journalism program.

Boulder Freeride
Boulder Freeride is the ski and snowboard club at the University of Colorado Boulder. It was started in 1933, and has thrived as the largest student-run, nonprofit organization on CU's campus. It is not only the largest ski club on campus but is the largest ski club in the United States. It was designed to promote skiing, and later, snowboarding at the University of Colorado Boulder campus.

Boulder Freeride is active year-round. Fall activities include a camping trip, BBQs, popular ski and snowboard movie premieres, and one of the year's biggest events, Welcome Freeriders.

Boulder Freeride organizes a number of ski trips each year. Past trips have included a Thanksgiving trip to Steamboat Springs, Colorado, an annual trip to Aspen, Colorado to see the X Games, spring break trips to Innsbruck, Austria, Whistler, BC and Chamonix, France, and summer surf trips to South America.

CU Cycling Club
Founded in 1983 by Jim Castagneri, the cycling team was taken to the national championships in 1987 by 1992 Olympian John Stenner. The CU cycling team frequently ranks in the top five USA Cycling Collegiate teams in both road cycling and mountain biking disciplines. They have won the national championship on several occasions, including 2005, when they won in both disciplines. Many members of the club have gone on into professional cycling, including Sepp Kuss and Tyler Hamilton.

The team is open to any student who pays annual dues and meets a minimum amount of credits during the semester. The members include nearly every different type of cyclist, from BMX riders, trials, and bicycle commuters to elite amateur or part-time professional road and mountain riders. Specifically, to qualify for road or mountain nationals, a rider must have enough high race results to upgrade to "A" category in the USA Cycling rankings. A number of "A" riders will be chosen by the coaches to represent CU at the National Championships. The number of riders the team is allowed to send is based on how well the team did overall during the season.

Program Council
Established in 1953, Program Council is a student-run group that coordinates concerts and movies played on campus throughout the year. Program Council mainly focuses on organizing concerts around campus. Over the years, this group has brought such acts as The Rolling Stones, The Who, Dave Matthews Band, Pearl Jam, R.E.M., The Ramones, Henry Rollins, and many more to the University of Colorado. Concerts vary in size ranging from large-scale concerts to smaller local acts, some of which are free to attend. Besides concerts, Program Council also hosts a film series throughout the year which allows students to see soon-to-be-released movies as well as cult classics for free in one of the large lecture halls on campus.

The Herd
The Herd is one of the largest student alumni groups in the nation, with over 6,000 members. The Herd's main goal is increasing school spirit. It encourages students to attend school activities such as sports games and club meetings. The Herd also sponsors discounted bus rides to the ski slopes, discounts around Boulder, and football pre-game parties. Sixteen student leaders run the group; the group is open to currently enrolled students.

Volunteer Resource Center
The Volunteer Resource Center is a student-funded organization aimed towards promoting volunteerism in the Boulder community. They provide a database with volunteer opportunities of 250 organizations around campus and in the Boulder area. The CU Boulder campus was recently one of 3 U.S. Universities to receive the Presidential Award for Exemplary Student Community Service in 2008. The Volunteer Resource Center hosts or participates in special volunteer events and activities including Alternative Breaks, Better Boulder Better World, and The Buffalo Can Challenge. The Volunteer Resource Center is also a yearly Volunteer Internship Program which engages six selected students through an interview process to create events aimed at involving more freshmen in volunteering, effectively managing all logistics of the event, and implementing the events on campus.

Greek life
The Panhellenic sorority community consists of ten Panhellenic sororities (Alpha Phi, Alpha Chi Omega, Delta Gamma, Kappa Kappa Gamma, Pi Beta Phi, Delta Delta Delta, Chi Omega, Kappa Alpha Theta, Gamma Phi Beta, and the newest Phi Mu) and three associate, local-interest, chapters (Alpha Delta Chi, Phi Sigma Rho, and Sigma Alpha Epsilon Pi). The men's fraternities at the University of Colorado are not officially affiliated with the school; however, they are still a presence on campus. Students who participate in Greek Life account for about 13% of the undergraduate student body. The recruitment process consists of four datebooks, dressing from more casual to formal as the datebooks progress. The first day is the introduction, the second day is philanthropy, the third day is skit night, and the fourth day is preference night. Most of CU-Boulder active Greek organizations in the Panhellenic and Interfraternity Councils have large traditional Greek houses primarily for members to utilize.

There is also a Multicultural Greek Council that is composed of Asian Greek letter organizations, Latino/a Greek letter organizations, and multicultural Greek-letter organizations. The MGC acts as a liaison between the member organizations and university administration and promotes unity between the organizations and the college community.

Left Right TIM Improv Comedy 
Started in 2008 by CU-Boulder students, Left Right TIM is the Boulder area's premier and longest-running improv comedy team, performing a weekly improvised comedy show every Friday during the university's academic year in the Hale Anthropology Building Room 270 of the school's campus. The team accepts new members every year and has performed in cities around the country as well as opening for established stand-up comedians and improv theaters. On February 23, 2018, the group celebrated its 10-year anniversary.

Umbrella Improv Initiative 
A few years after Left Right TIM was founded, Camden Johnson, a member of LRT, saw the need for an organization to cater to beginners and comedy novices who were interested in improv. He founded the Umbrella Improv Initiative, or the "Umbrella Academy", which selected student coaches to teach a new team of 10 to 12 improvisers based on the Upright Citizens Brigade's style of improv. Over the course of a 12-week semester, the group was given a crash course in short form and long form improve comedy, culminating with a debut show at the end of the term in Hale 270. Since its founding in 2011, Umbrella has graduated over a dozen "Generations" of improvisers, and the organization continues to grow, with Gen 17 set to begin in the fall of 2019.

Sports, clubs, and traditions

Sports teams at the school are called Buffaloes. The varsity athletic teams participate in the NCAA's Division I (FBS for football, see Bowl Championship Series) as a member of the Pac-12 Conference. The school officially joined the Pac-12 on July 1, 2011, ending its affiliation with the Big 12 Conference. (CU had previously been a member of the former Big Eight Conference, whose members had merged with four schools of the former Southwest Conference to create the new Big 12 Conference in 1996.) The official school colors are silver and gold, as opposed to the common belief of black and gold. Silver and gold were chosen to represent the state's mineral wealth, but the colors did not look good together on the uniforms, so black was substituted. There are three official fight songs: "Glory Colorado", "Go Colorado", and "Fight CU." In the early 1980s, the Board of Regents changed the school colors to sky blue and gold; but the changed proved highly unpopular with students and alumni, and the colors were changed back after 1985.

In 1934, the university teams were officially nicknamed the "Buffaloes." Previous nicknames used by the press included the "Silver Helmets" and "Frontiersmen." The final game of 1934, against the University of Denver, saw the first running of a buffalo in a Colorado football game. A buffalo calf was rented from a local ranch and ran along the sidelines.

Varsity athletics

CU's varsity teams have won national championships in skiing, men's cross country, women's cross country, and football. Conference championships have also been won in several sports. Several club sports, such as cycling, swimming & diving, and triathlon, have won national championships in addition to the varsity teams.

In football, CU enjoys an in-state rivalry with the Colorado State Rams in the "Rocky Mountain Showdown", a game that is played at the neutral site Empower Field at Mile High. Additionally, Colorado and former Big Eight and Big 12 rival Nebraska Cornhuskers have played some notable games, often finishing their respective seasons in nationally televised confrontations on the Friday following Thanksgiving since the 1990s. This ended after the 2010 season as a result of CU joining the Pac-12 and Nebraska joining the Big Ten Conference.

Colorado once had rivalries with the Utah Utes and the Air Force Falcons, but these have not been played in recent years. However, the Utah rivalry was renewed in 2011, as the Utes also joined the Pac-10 (which became the Pac-12).

The CU ski team has won 20 National Championships at the Division I level. The sport is not sponsored by the Pac-12 Conference, however (nor was it sponsored by the Big 12).

Club sports

CU also maintains one of the largest club sports departments in the U.S. It supports over 30 club teams with leading clubs such as both men's and women's water polo, crew, cycling, ultimate, swimming & diving, fencing, men's lacrosse, baseball, softball, ice hockey, rugby union, and the CU Triathlon Team.

Mascot & spirit program

CU also includes a spirit program. The spirit program consists of three teams: two cheerleading squads, and the CU Express Dance Team. The cheerleading program consists of a competitive co-ed squad as well as a competitive all-girl squad. Both the cheerleading squad and the Express Dance Team compete at NCA/NDA College Nationals. In 2007, the cheerleading squad finished sixth at NCA Nationals in Daytona Beach, Florida. All squads support the home games of football, Women's Basketball, Men's Basketball, and Women's Volleyball teams, along with other athletic and social events.

The school's live mascot is a female American Bison named Ralphie. The costumed mascot CHIP is also a part of the CU Spirit Program. CHIP is a costumed buffalo that represents the University of Colorado at numerous athletic and social events. Along with the Cheer and Dance Program, CHIP competes on a national level once a year against mascots from around the country, including Bucky Badger, Sparty, Aubie, Goldy Gopher and many other Hall of Fame mascots. Most recently CHIP competed in the 2009 UCA national competition and was crowned #1, and the national champion after performing a skit titled "CHIP's Favorite Video Games".

Clubs and other organizations
CU Boulder offers a variety of political student organizations which cover the full spectrum of politics. Among them are Amnesty International, which focuses on human rights worldwide, as well as the College Democrats and the College Republicans. The University of Colorado also offers many clubs promoting diversity and human rights, such as the Gay Straight Alliance. Students can also choose from a plethora of clubs and organizations centered on ethnicities and countries, as well as different religious groups. CU Boulder also maintains one of the nation's most competitive student-run parliamentary debate programs. In 2010, CU Boulder became the first fully student-run program to win the National Parliamentary Tournament of Excellence (NPTE).

Demographics
As of Fall 2021, there were 35,897 students enrolled. 66.2 percent of the student population identifies as white and 56.9% are Colorado residents and 10.1% are California residents.  Most students at CU Boulder are aligned with the American political left. A 2014 survey stated that 16.3% of the students are registered as members of the Republican Party, along with 10.5% of CU Boulder non-faculty staff and 6% of CU Boulder faculty.

In May 2021, CU Boulder announced the investment of $25 million over the next five years to diversity programs including the recruitment, retention, and support for students, faculty, and staff coming from underrepresented communities.

Notable alumni

The University of Colorado Boulder ranks fourth among U.S. universities in the number of astronauts produced, not including military academies. In addition, the University of Colorado Boulder has graduated two Heads of State: Mongolian President Tsakhiagiin Elbegdorj and Liberian President Ellen Johnson Sirleaf; and two associate justices of the Supreme Court of the United States: Wiley Rutledge and Byron White. Indian-American astronaut Kalpana Chawla was also an alumna, as was the filmmaker and director Monty Miranda. Yolanda Shea, a research scientist at NASA Langley Research Center, is also an alumnus.

Notable accomplishments at CU
 First to create a new form of matter, the Bose–Einstein condensate, just seven hundred billionths of a degree above absolute zero.
 First to observe a "fermionic condensate" formed from pairs of atoms in a gas.
 Developed the "FluChip" to aid physicians in diagnosing respiratory illness and differentiating between three types of influenza and other viruses that cause similar symptoms.
 First place in the 2002 and 2005 U.S. Department of Energy Solar Decathlon. At these first two Solar Decathlon competitions, students and faculty from the Engineering and Architecture programs collaborated to design, construct, transport, and rebuild a house powered exclusively by the sun.
 The Squid server was created at the University of Colorado Boulder by Duane Wessels as part of Harvest project under grant from the National Science Foundation.
 First zero-waste sports stadium (both collegiate and professional) in the nation.

Scholarships 
The Charles and Mildred Nilon Teacher Education Scholarship Fund honors Charles and Mildred Nilon, CU's first African American professor and librarian, respectively.   The scholarship is designated for students who are “committed to advancing educational opportunities in under-resourced schools, especially those that serve African American communities.”

The Lucile Berkeley Buchanan Scholarship was created to honor Lucile Berkeley Buchanan, CU's first African American female graduate who graduated in 1918.

Notes

References

External links

 
 CU Athletics website
 
 
 
 

 
Buildings and structures in Boulder, Colorado
Educational institutions established in 1876
1876 establishments in Colorado Territory
Tourist attractions in Boulder, Colorado
Flagship universities in the United States
Boulder
Universities and colleges accredited by the Higher Learning Commission